The Yamaha XV1000 SE or Midnight Special is a special edition Yamaha V-twin cruiser motorcycle. The XV920 was made from 1983 to 1985 and was based on Yamaha's Virago line of V-twin cruisers that are part of Yamaha's XV generation first launched in 1981.
The top speed of SV1000 SE is 172.0 km/h (106.9 mph) with a maximum acceleration is 0-100 km/h in 5.3 seconds (0-60 mph 5.1 seconds).

See also
 Yamaha XV920
 Yamaha XV1100

References

Virago 1000
Cruiser motorcycles
Motorcycles introduced in 1983